A lava channel is a stream of fluid lava contained within zones of static (i.e., solid and stationary) lava or lava levees. The initial channel may not contain levees per se, until the parental flow solidifies over what develops into the channel and creates natural levees. This initial levee allows for the building of a more complex levee and channel. As the lava flows through the channel, the elevation of the surface of the lava flow pulsates and lava can possibly flood the associated channel walls spilling out of the channel and over the existing levees, creating what is known as overflow levees. Overflow levees increase the height and width of the original levee. The lava that flows in lava channels is commonly basaltic in composition.

See also
Lava tube

References
Ailsa Allaby and Michael Allaby. "lava channel." A Dictionary of Earth Sciences. 1999. Retrieved June 27, 2011 from Encyclopedia.com
Harris, A., M, Favalli., F, Mazzarini, C, Hamilton., 2008.  Construction dynamics of a lava channel.  Bulletin of Volcanology. 71. (4):459-474.

External links
A clearer photo of a lava channel and natural levees

 
Volcanism
Volcanic landforms